Piz Nuna is a mountain in the Sesvenna Range of the Alps, located northeast of Zernez in the canton of Graubünden. Its summit (3,124 m) is the tripoint between the valley of Val Nuna, Val Sampuoir and Val Laschadura.

References

External links
 Piz Nuna on Hikr

Mountains of Graubünden
Mountains of the Alps
Alpine three-thousanders
Mountains of Switzerland
Scuol
Zernez